Micronola is a genus of moths of the family Erebidae. The genus was erected by Amsel in 1935.

Species
Micronola wadicola Amsel, 1935
Micronola yemeni Fibiger, 2011
Micronola zahirii Fibiger, 2011
Micronola irani Fibiger, 2011

Taxonomy
The genus was originally placed in the family Nolidae.

References

Micronoctuini
Noctuoidea genera